This page lists public opinion polls conducted for the 2017 French presidential election, which was held on 23 April 2017 with a run-off on 7 May 2017, within individual regions.

Unless otherwise noted, all polls listed below are compliant with the regulations of the national polling commission (Commission nationale des sondages) and utilize the quota method.

First round

By region 
Auvergne-Rhône-Alpes

Bourgogne-Franche-Comté

Brittany

Centre-Val de Loire

Grand Est

Hauts-de-France

Île-de-France

Normandy

Nouvelle-Aquitaine

Occitanie

Pays de la Loire

Provence-Alpes-Côte d'Azur

By constituency 
French residents overseas

French residents overseas' 1st

French residents overseas' 5th

French residents overseas' 11th

Second round

Macron–Le Pen

By region 
Auvergne-Rhône-Alpes

Bourgogne-Franche-Comté

Brittany

Centre-Val de Loire

Grand Est

Hauts-de-France

Île-de-France

Normandy

Nouvelle-Aquitaine

Occitanie

Pays de la Loire

Provence-Alpes-Côte d'Azur

Fillon–Le Pen

By region

Macron–Fillon

By region

Mélenchon–Macron

By region

Mélenchon–Fillon

By region

Mélenchon–Le Pen

By region

External links 
Notices of the French polling commission 

Opinion polling in France
2017 French presidential election
France